KJID-LP (92.5 FM) is a terrestrial American low power radio station, licensed to Tyler, Smith County, Texas, United States, and is owned by the Iglesia de Dios Jesucristo Manantiales de Vida.

KJID-LP's studio is located at 520 Bow St., in downtown Tyler.

History
Iglesia de Dios Jesuchristo Manantiales de Vida received a construction permit to build a low power Class L1 FM radio station, licensed to Tyler, on February 5, 2015. The facility was modified twice, through subsequent amendments to the license, and received a License to Cover from the Federal Communications Commission on August 1, 2016.

It airs a Spanish language religious format. Due to the low power of the Class L1 facility, KJID-LP's signal is limited to the city center population within Loop 323, as well as northern areas outside the Loop, still in close proximity to the city center.

References

External links

JID-LP
Radio stations established in 2016
JID-LP